Ostreopsis lenticularis is a species of dinoflagellate of the family Ostreopsidaceae described in 1981 by Yasuwo Fukuyo.

Distribution
This species is endemic to Tahiti.

References

 Fukuyo Y. 1981. Taxonomical study on benthic dinoflagellates collected in coral reefs. Bull. Jap. Soc. Sci. Fish. 47: 967-978
 Gómez, F. (2005). A list of free-living dinoflagellate species in the world's oceans. Acta Bot. Croat. 64(1): 129-212
 Streftaris, N.; Zenetos, A.; Papathanassiou, E. (2005). Globalisation in marine ecosystems: the story of non-indigenous marine species across European seas. Oceanogry and Marine Biology: an Annual Review. 43: 419-453
 Steidinger, K. A., M. A. Faust, and D. U. Hernández-Becerril. 2009. Dinoflagellates (Dinoflagellata) of the Gulf of Mexico, Pp. 131–154 in Felder, D.L. and D.K. Camp (eds.), Gulf of Mexico–Origins, Waters, and Biota. Biodiversity. Texas A&M Press, college
  Chang, F.H.; Charleston, W.A.G.; McKenna, P.B.; Clowes, C.D.; Wilson, G.J.; Broady, P.A. (2012). Phylum Myzozoa: dinoflagellates, perkinsids, ellobiopsids, sporozoans, in: Gordon, D.P. (Ed.) (2012). New Zealand inventory of biodiversity: 3. Kingdoms Bacteria, Protozoa, Chromista, Plantae, Fungi. pp. 175–216. 
 Tindall D.R., Miller D.M. & Tindall P.M. 1990. Toxicity of Ostreopsis lenticularis from the British and United States Virgin Islands. In: Toxic Marine Phytoplankton (Ed. by E. Granéli, B. Sundström, L. Edler, D.M. Anderson), pp. 424 – 429. Elsevier, New York
 Meunier F.A., Mercado J.A., Molgo J., Tosteson T.R. & Gotta G.E. 1997. Selective depolarization of the muscle membrane in frog nerve-muscle preparations by a chromatographically purified extract of the dinoflagellate Ostreopsis lenticularis. Brit. J. Pharmacol. 121: 1224-1230
 Lenoir S., Ten-Hage L., Turquet J., Quod J.-P., Bernard C. & Hennion M.-C. 2004. First evidence of palytoxin analogues from an Ostreopsis mascarenensis (Dinophyceae) benthic bloom in Southwestern Indian Ocean. J. Phycol. 40: 1042-1051

External links
 Guiry, M.D. & Guiry, G.M. (2022). AlgaeBase. World-wide electronic publication, National University of Ireland, Galway
 
 
 Moestrup, Ø., Akselman, R., Cronberg, G., Elbraechter, M., Fraga, S., Halim, Y., Hansen, G., Hoppenrath, M., Larsen, J., Lundholm, N., Nguyen, L. N., Zingone, A. (Eds) (2009 onwards). IOC-UNESCO Taxonomic Reference List of Harmful Micro Algae
 

Gonyaulacales